William Dunstan (4 December 1878 – 11 April 1955) was an Australian cricketer. He played one first-class match for Western Australia in 1905/06.

See also
 List of Western Australia first-class cricketers

References

External links
 

1878 births
1955 deaths
Australian cricketers
Western Australia cricketers
Cricketers from Adelaide